Jimmy Simons (born 24 October 1970 in Paramaribo, Suriname), is a Dutch footballer who played seven times for Dutch team Feyenoord.

References

1970 births
Living people
Feyenoord players
Dutch footballers
Sportspeople from Paramaribo
Association footballers not categorized by position
20th-century Dutch people